Bandy  was played for the first time in the 2019 Winter Universiade. The sport was one of the three optional sports chosen by the Organizing Committee of that edition.

Events

Medalist winners

Men

Women

Medal table 
Last updated after the 2019 Winter Universiade

References 

 
Universiade
Sports at the Winter Universiade